Super 8 is a 2011 American science fiction  thriller film written and directed by J. J. Abrams and co-produced by Steven Spielberg. The film stars Joel Courtney, Elle Fanning, and Kyle Chandler and tells the story of a group of young teenagers in 1979 who are filming their own Super 8 movie when a train derails, releasing a dangerous presence into their town. The film was shot in Weirton, West Virginia, and surrounding areas, portraying the fictional town of Lillian, Ohio.

Super 8 was released on June 10, 2011, in conventional and IMAX theaters in the United States. It received generally positive reviews from critics, who praised Abram's direction, its nostalgic elements, visual effects, musical score and for the performances of the cast, in particular,  both Fanning and newcomer Courtney's acting was cited, while also being compared to such thematically similar films as E.T., Stand by Me, and The Goonies, featuring a darker interpretation of those iconic premises. Super 8 was also a commercial success, grossing over $260 million against a $50 million budget. The film received several awards and nominations, primarily in technical and special effects categories, Giacchino's musical score, as well as for Courtney and Fanning's performances.

Plot

In 1979, fourteen year old Joe Lamb mourns his mother Elizabeth who died recently in a workplace accident. He clings to his mom's memory in the form of a locket.  Joe's  dad, Deputy Sheriff Jack Lamb, blames Louis Dainard for his wife's death.  Dainard showed up drunk to work that day so Elizabeth had to cover his shift. 

Four months later Joe's friend Charles is making a zombie movie for a Super 8 film competition. He enlists Joe's help along with friends Preston, Martin, and Cary, as well as Dainard's daughter, Alice. Though their fathers are opposed to their friendship, Joe and Alice become close.

While filming at a train depot at midnight, a train approaches and a pickup truck rams the train head-on, derailing it and destroying the depot. The children are separated in the chaos. Joe sees the door of a train wagon violently thrown off. The kids regroup and find crates of strange white cubes amid the wreckage before discovering the truck driver to be their biology teacher Dr. Woodward. Gravely injured, he warns them at gunpoint to forget what they have seen. They flee, as a convoy from the local Air Force base, led by Col. Nelec, arrives. Nelec finds an empty super 8 film box.

In the following days the town experiences strange events; dogs run away, several townspeople go missing, the electrical power fluctuates, and electronic items are stolen. Jack approaches Nelec but Nelec arrests him. Nelec orders flamethrowers to start a wildfire as an excuse to evacuate the residents to the base. Joe and Charles watch their derailment footage and see that a large creature escaped the train. Nelec confronts Woodward in a military hospital, seeking information about the creature, but when Woodward rebukes him, Nelec has him killed.

Alice's father tells Joe the creature has abducted her. Joe, Charles, Martin, and Cary persuade Jen, Charles' older sister, to flirt with Donny so he can get them into town to rescue Alice. Breaking into Dr. Woodward's trailer they find documents and a film from his time as a government researcher.

The film and tape recorder reveal that in 1958, the Air Force captured an alien when it crash-landed. They experimented on the alien, while withholding its space craft, composed of the strange white cubes, which allowed the craft to shape-shift. The alien had established a psychic connection with Woodward, convincing him to help it escape Earth, but Nelec sabotaged, discredited, and discharged Woodward. While the kids are watching Nelec captures them but the alien kills Nelec and the airmen, allowing the kids to escape. Jack escapes and agrees with Louis to put their differences aside to save their kids.

The military attacks the alien but their hardware goes haywire in its presence, resulting in significant collateral damage. Joe and Cary find a massive tunnel system under the town. The missing townfolk, including Alice, are hanging unconscious from the ceiling of a cavern. Here, the alien is creating a device, constructed from the missing electronics, and attached to the base of the water tower. Using firecrackers as a distraction, Joe frees Alice and the others. The alien grabs Joe, who quietly speaks to it. Establishing an emotional connection between the two of them, the alien allows them to return to the surface.

Everyone watches as metal objects from the town are pulled to the top of the tower by an unknown force. The white cubes reassemble to create a spaceship and, as the alien enters it, the locket in Joe's pocket is drawn toward the tower. After a moment, he lets it go, completing the ship. As the ship rises into space, Joe takes Alice's hand.

The detective-zombie short film the children were making in Super 8 rolls runs at the end of the movie beside the credit roll. In it, Charles asks for his short film "The Case" to be picked for a local film festival before being attacked by Alice as a zombie.

Cast

Joel Courtney as Joe Lamb
Elle Fanning as Alice Dainard
Riley Griffiths as Charles Kaznyk
Ryan Lee as Cary McCarthy
Gabriel Basso as Martin Read
Zach Mills as Preston Scott
Kyle Chandler as Deputy Jack Lamb
Ron Eldard as Louis Dainard
AJ Michalka as Jen Kaznyk
Joel McKinnon Miller as Mr. Kaznyk
Jessica Tuck as Mrs. Kaznyk
Brett Rice as Sheriff Pruitt
Michael Giacchino as Deputy Crawford
Michael Hitchcock as Deputy Rosko
Jay Scully as Deputy Skadden
Noah Emmerich as Colonel Nelec
Richard T. Jones as Overmyer
Bruce Greenwood as The Alien (credited as Cooper)
David Gallagher as Donny
Glynn Turman as Dr. Thomas Woodward
Beau Knapp as Breen
Dan Castellaneta as Izzy
Caitriona Balfe as Elizabeth Lamb
Dale Dickey as Edie

Production

Development

J.J. Abrams had the idea to start a film by showing a factory's "Accident-Free" sign long before he came up with the rest of the ideas for the film. Super 8 was actually the combination of two ideas; one for a film about kids making their own movie during the 1970s, and another for a blockbuster alien invasion film. Abrams combined the ideas, worried that the former would not attract enough attendance.

Abrams and Spielberg collaborated in a storytelling committee to come up with the story for the film. The film was initially reported to be either a sequel or prequel to the 2008 film Cloverfield, but this was quickly denied by Abrams. Primary photography began in fall (September/October) 2010. The teaser itself was filmed separately in April. Super 8 is the first original J. J. Abrams film project produced by Amblin Entertainment, Bad Robot Productions, and Paramount Pictures.

Abrams wanted to find new faces to play the parts in his movie. He conducted a national talent search in order to find the child actors to play each of the leading roles. Courtney (who was hoping to land a part in a commercial) was picked out of many boys because Abrams found something "different" in him. Riley Griffiths sent Abrams a tape of himself in order to land the part of Charles.

Filming
Filming took place in Weirton, West Virginia, from September 20, 2010, to December 16, 2010. To promote the film, Valve created a short video game segment and released it alongside the Windows and Mac versions of Portal 2.

Abrams' original plan was to film all of the sequences for the film-within-a-film, "The Case", in Super-8 using Pro8mm stock and cameras. However, this approach proved unsuccessful, as visual effects house Industrial Light and Magic found it impossible to integrate CGI into the footage due to the format's graininess. For sequences involving CGI, cinematographer Larry Fong used Super-16 instead.

Soundtrack

The score for the film was composed by Michael Giacchino, Abrams' long-time collaborator. The soundtrack was released on August 2, 2011, by Varèse Sarabande. It won the 2012 Saturn Award for Best Music.

During the ending credits, the songs "Don't Bring Me Down" by Electric Light Orchestra and "My Sharona" by The Knack are featured. The Blondie song "Heart of Glass" and The Cars song "Bye Bye Love" are also featured in the film.

Viral marketing campaign
Like Cloverfield, an earlier J. J. Abrams-produced film, Super 8 was promoted through an extensive viral marketing campaign. The first trailer for the movie was attached to Iron Man 2, released in May 2010. The trailer gave the premise of a section of Area 51 being closed down in 1979 and its contents being transported by freight train to Ohio. A pickup truck drives into the oncoming train, derailing it, and one of the carriages is smashed open while a Super 8 camera films. Fans analyzing the trailer found a hidden message, "Scariest Thing I Ever Saw", contained in the final frames of the trailer. This led to a website, www.scariestthingieversaw.com, which simulated the interface of a PDP-11 and contained various clues to the film's story-line; the computer was eventually revealed to belong to Josh Woodward, the son of Dr. Woodward, who is trying to find out what happened to his father. Another viral website, www.rocketpoppeteers.com, was also found, which like Slusho from Cloverfield plays no direct part in the film but is indirectly related. The official Super 8 website also contained an "editing room" section, which asked users to find various clips from around the web and piece them together. When completed, the reel makes up the film found by the kids in Dr. Woodward's trailer, showing the ship disintegrating into individual white cubes, and the alien reaching through the window of its cage and snatching Dr. Woodward. The video game Portal 2 contains an interactive trailer placing the player on board the train before it derails, and showing the carriage being smashed open and the roar of the alien within.

Release
The film was released on June 9, 2011, in Australia; June 10, 2011, in the United States; and August 5, 2011, in the United Kingdom. On June 8, Paramount also launched a “Super 8 Sneak Peek” Twitter promotion, offering fans a chance to purchase tickets for an advance screening, taking place on June 9, 2011, in the United States. The film opened at #1 in the U.S. Box Office for that weekend, grossing about $35 million.

Home media
The film was released on Blu-ray and DVD on November 22, 2011. The release was produced as a combo pack with a Digital Copy, including nine bonus features and fourteen deleted scenes. A 4K Blu-Ray edition was released on its tenth anniversary (May 24, 2021).

Reception

Box office
Super 8 had a production budget of $50 million. The film grossed $127 million in North America with a worldwide total of some $260 million.

Critical response
On the film-critics aggregator Rotten Tomatoes, the film holds an approval rating of 81% based on 295 reviews, and an average score of 7.30/10. The website's critical consensus reads, "It may evoke memories of classic summer blockbusters a little too eagerly for some, but Super 8 has thrills, visual dazzle, and emotional depth to spare." Metacritic, which assigns a weighted average score based on reviews from critics, gives the film a score of 72 out of 100 based on 41 reviews, indicating "generally favorable reviews". Audiences polled by CinemaScore gave the film an average grade of "B+" on an A+ to F scale.

Chris Sosa of Gather gave the film an A rating, calling it, "a gripping and exciting tale of finding one's place in the world amidst tragedy". His review concluded, "While the genre-bending occasionally unsettles, the film's genuine and emotionally gripping nature make its journey believable."

Roger Ebert gave the film three and a half stars out of four and said, "Super 8 is a wonderful film, nostalgia not for a time but for a style of film-making, when shell-shocked young audiences were told a story and not pounded over the head with aggressive action. Abrams treats early adolescence with tenderness and affection." Richard Corliss of Time gave it a similarly positive review, calling it "the year's most thrilling, feeling mainstream movie". He then named it one of the Top 10 Best Movies of 2011. Jamie Graham of Total Film gave the film a perfect five-star rating, saying, "like Spielberg, Abrams has an eye for awe, his deft orchestration of indelible images – a tank trundling through a children's playground, a plot-pivotal landmark framed in the distance through a small hole in a bedroom wall – marking him as a born storyteller". Christopher Orr of The Atlantic called it a "love letter to a cinematic era", while Claudia Puig of USA Today praised it as "a summer blockbuster firing on all cylinders".

Critics and audiences alike were polarized on the film's ending. Some found it to be emotional, powerful, and satisfying while others found it rushed and forced. For example, writing for MUBI's Notebook, Fernando F. Croce alleged that "no film this year opens more promisingly and ends more dismally than J.J. Abrams' Super 8." Other critics commented negatively on the film's frequent homages to early works of Spielberg, particularly in its depiction of broken families (a theme Spielberg has explored in nearly all of his films). For example, CNN's Tom Charity felt that "Abrams' imitation [was] a shade too reverent for [his] taste." David Edelstein, of New York magazine, called it a "flagrant crib," adding that "Abrams has probably been fighting not to reproduce Spielberg's signature moves since the day he picked up a camera. Now, with the blessing of the master, he can plagiarize with alacrity."

Accolades

In addition to these awards, the film was short-listed for the Academy Award for Best Visual Effects and Best Original Score, and the BAFTA Award for Best Original Screenplay, Best Sound, and Best Special Visual Effects. Paramount submitted it for several considerations for the BAFTAs including Best Film, Best Director (J. J. Abrams), Best Original Screenplay, Leading Actor (Kyle Chandler), Supporting Actress (Elle Fanning), Supporting Actor (Joel Courtney, Gabriel Basso, Noah Emmerich), Cinematography, Production Design, Editing, Costume Design, Original Music, Sound, Makeup and Hair, and Special Visual Effects.

References

External links

 
 
 
 Super 8 on Letterboxd.com

2011 films
2010s monster movies
2010s science fiction thriller films
2011 science fiction films
Amblin Entertainment films
Films about extraterrestrial life
Alien visitations in films
Alien abduction films
American monster movies
American science fiction thriller films
Bad Robot Productions films
Films about filmmaking
Films directed by J. J. Abrams
Films produced by J. J. Abrams
Films produced by Steven Spielberg
Films scored by Michael Giacchino
Films set in 1979
Films set in Ohio
Films shot in West Virginia
Films with screenplays by J. J. Abrams
IMAX films
Paramount Pictures films
Films about children
2010s English-language films
2010s American films